Rezaviyeh or Razuyeh or Razaviyeh or Razavieh may refer to:
 Razaviyeh, a city in Razavi Khorasan Province
 Razuyeh, Gonabad, Razavi Khorasan
 Razaviyeh, Kerman
 Razaviyeh, Kuhbanan, Kerman Province
 Rezaviyeh, South Khorasan
 Razaviyeh-ye Abkhvorak, South Khorasan Province
 Razaviyeh District, in Razavi Khorasan Province